Giuseppe Porcelli (born 1682) was an Italian painter, active in Messina.

Biography
Giuseppe was born in Messina and trained in Naples under Francesco Solimena. He painted for the churches of Sant'Antonio Abate and San Filippo de' Bianchi in Messina. He painted a San Pietro Nolasco for the church of San Carlo in Messina. Many of his works were destroyed by earthquakes. or Vico Equense.<ref>Storia della pittura in Napoli ed in Sicilia dalla fine del 1600, a noi, by Carlo Tito Dalbono, published by Luigi Gargulio, Naples (1859), pages 63–64.

References

1682 births
Date of death unknown
People from Messina
18th-century Italian painters
Italian male painters
Painters from Naples
Italian Baroque painters
18th-century Italian male artists